Michael Ashford (born September 15, 1955) is the former Minority Whip of the Ohio House of Representatives. He represented more than 116,000 constituents in a district wholly within the city of Toledo.

Career
Ashford, raised in Toledo, studied Sociology at the University of Nebraska and has a master's degree from Spring Arbor University. He has spent his career working to organize the community through the YMCA and the Boys and Girls Clubs. Ashford began his political career as a member of the Toledo City Council, first appointed in 2002, and serving until 2010. As a Toledo City Councilman representing District 4, Michael Ashford was first appointed to Council on January 2002, and then was honored by the support of District 4 residents in a special election and two general elections in 2003 and 2007 and served as president of Toledo City Council during 2007. He served as the chairman of the Public Utilities Committee during his Council service and campaigned for the passage of issue 79. Issue 79 was a ten-year lawsuit by U.S. EPA against the City of Toledo to address and correct aging in fracture, sewage discharge, and combined sewer overflows. The project started in 2003 and will be completed by 2018, improving the quality of water there for improving the quality of life. He also oversaw the creation of a major entertainment district in Downtown Toledo. Then Councilman Ashford tackled major budget issues while working closely with community development corporations and neighborhood organizations to secure dwindling government resources.

Ohio House of Representatives
With incumbent Edna Brown unable to seek reelection to the House due to term limits, Ashford entered the race. He was unopposed in the primary, and beat Republican Carolyn Eyre in the general election by 15,000 votes. Ashford was sworn into his first term on January 3, 2011. He serves on the committees of Finance and Appropriations where he is the Ranking Member of the Agriculture and Development subcommittee, Insurance, and Public Utilities, and the Ohio Commission on Fatherhood.

Committee assignments
House Committee on Finance and Appropriations
House Committee on Public Utilities 
House Committee on Insurance
House Committee on Rules and Reference
Joint Legislative Ethics Commission

Policies and initiatives

Ashford is critical of the Ohio Republican Party plan to end collective bargaining for state employees. "I think they think that by doing this they're going to create jobs and welcome home people," he said. "I don't know where they got their business philosophy, because this will have a devastating financial impact on the state."

Lucas County Democratic Party Chairman
On June 2, 2020, Ashford was elected Chairman of the Lucas County Democratic Party.

External links
Michael Ashford- Toledo City Council

References

1955 births
Democratic Party members of the Ohio House of Representatives
Living people
Politicians from Toledo, Ohio
University of Nebraska alumni
African-American state legislators in Ohio
21st-century American politicians
21st-century African-American politicians
20th-century African-American people